Morag McLaren (born 1957) is a Scottish singer, director and coach who now focuses on helping young singers at the early stages in their professional careers.

Early life and education
Morag McLaren was born and educated in Edinburgh, graduated in Music Education at Lancaster University and trained as an opera singer at the Royal Northern College of Music, where she studied singing with Frederick Cox.  As a mature student she completed an MA with distinction in Performance Health and Personal Development at London College of Music.

Performing and recording career
Morag McLaren has performed in opera, musicals, concerts, music theatre productions, improvisation, one woman shows, cabarets and recordings during her career, including principal roles with Welsh National Opera (The Mother and Witch in Hansel and Gretel), Scottish Opera (Lucy in Threepenny Opera), The Royal National Theatre (Mrs Segstrom in A Little Night Music) and in the West End (Carlotta in Phantom of the Opera).

Morag McLaren toured internationally with Opera Circus (www.operacircusuk.com)(The Good Wife in Shameless an Immoral Tale), presented on BBC Radio 3 The Music Tree, released three solo CDs (I Never Do Anything Twice; Nobody Does It Like Me – A Tribute To Dorothy Fields; Tonight: Lola Blau - https://www.amazon.com/Morag-McLaren/e/B001LHOTRG) and featured on RNT (www.nationaltheatre.org.uk)cast recording (A Little Night Music - https://www.discogs.com/Stephen-Sondheim-Judi-Dench-Patricia-Hodge-Si%C3%A2n-Phillips-A-Little-Night-Music-1996-Royal-National-T/release/5586426) and other compilations (e.g. Dangerous Cabaret – The Music & Lyrics of Brett Kahr' -  'https://www.amazon.co.uk/Dangerous-Cabaret-Music-Lyrics-Brett/dp/B000E7FT32). She has presented one-woman shows worldwide, including Dorothy Fields: Rhythm of Life and Georg Kreisler’s Tonight Lola Blau. She is a founder member of the opera improvisation group, Impropera (www.impropera.co.uk).

Education Work
Morag McLaren also works as a workshop leader/vocal consultant for emerging artists in the early stages of their professional careers and has led performance workshops and master classes at The Guildhall School of Music and Drama (https://www.gsmd.ac.uk),  Ardingly International Music School, Guildford School of Acting (https://gsauk.org), London College of Music (https://www.uwl.ac.uk), where she also directed a production of Dido and Aeneas), and The Cooper Hall Emerging Artists Workshops (www.cooperhall.org). Her teaching collaboration with Theresa Goble (Vox Integra www.voxintegra.com) involves her in a range of vocal workshops, with an emphasis on the integration of vocal skills with acting for singers.

Cooper Hall
Morag McLaren is the founder and principal Trustee of The Cooper Hall Foundation charity (www.cooperhall.org), promotes music performances, education and the development of creative projects at Cooper Hall, a performance space, venue near Frome, Somerset.

At Cooper Hall Morag McLaren directed the operas The Turn of the Screw, Hansel and Gretel, and Cosi Fan Tutte for Frome Festival in collaboration with Bath Philharmonia. She describes her approach to these small scale productions as workshop led direction.

Morag McLaren also directed Dido and Aeneas'' at London College of Music.

Morag McLaren is Patron of Frome Festival (www.fromefestival.co.uk),

Personal life
She is married and has two adult children. Her son Gregor Riddell (www.gregorriddell.co.uk) is a professional cellist and composer and her daughter Kirsty Riddell (www.kirstyriddell.com) is an artist .

References

Living people
20th-century Scottish women opera singers
Scottish musical theatre actresses
Musicians from Edinburgh
Alumni of the Royal Northern College of Music
1957 births
21st-century Scottish women opera singers